"Bulletproof Picasso" is a song recorded by American rock band Train for their seventh studio album Bulletproof Picasso. The song was written by Pat Monahan, Butch Walker, Trent Mazur and Michael Freesh and was produced by the latter two as well as Butch Walker. It was released on January 26, 2015 as the third single from the album.

Music video
A music video to accompany the release of "Bulletproof Picasso" was first released onto YouTube on 23 January 2015 at a total length of four minutes and 11 seconds.

Track listing

Chart performance

Weekly charts

Release history

References

2014 songs
Songs written by Butch Walker
Song recordings produced by Butch Walker
Columbia Records singles
Songs written by Pat Monahan